The Estonian mark was the currency of Estonia between 1918 and 1927. It was running parallel with payment notes from the Clearing House of Tallinn as there was lack of cash in Estonia. The last available payment notes were exchanged for marks in 1923. 11 November 1918 Estonian Provisional Government did assemble as after Armistice to discuss questions of finance among others and 30 November 1918 Provisional Government agreed to establish Estonian mark. The example was Germany as Estonian finance was influenced by the German law in 1918. It was initially equivalent to the German ostmark, which had been circulating alongside the Imperial rouble since the German occupation. It was divided into 100 penns (in Nominative case: penn).

Until 1919 there were also Russian rubles, German ostrubels and Finnish marks in circulation.

The first marks were printed in Estonia and Finland in different nominations and there were different types. These were released first to public use in spring 1919 by Bank of Estonia since from 30 April 1919, they had only right to release bank notes in Estonia. First mark was cashregister note. 1922 appeared exchange note that as per regulations, government institutions and agencies were obligated to accept in unlimited quantities and private institutions and persons up to 2000 marks with each payment. Finally were also released Bank of Estonia bank note that was fully covered by "banks assets and pawned assets in banks possession".

When mark was initially introduced, Estonian government tried to back it up with real collateral but this did not work so the mark did become just paper currency without cover. Due to the economical situation, high inflation of marks and depletion of gold reserves, state prepared to organize monetary reform to stable the situation. 
Mark was replaced in 1924 in foreign trade and 1928 in daily use by the Estonian kroon at a rate of 1 kroon = 100 marka.
As there was not enough kroon bank notes printed by 1928, the final series of 100 mark cashregister notes were overprinted with text one kroon

Coins

Coins were issued in denominations of 1, 3, 5, and 10 marka between 1922 and 1926. The 1922 issues were struck in cupro-nickel whilst the later issues were in nickel-bronze.

Banknotes

In 1919, treasury notes ("kassatäht") were issued in denominations of 5, 10, 20, and 50 pennies, 1, 3, 5, 10, 25, 50, and 100 marks ("pangatäht"). Later, treasury notes were issued in denominations up to 1,000 marks, along with banknotes up to 5,000 marks. Exchange notes ("vahetustäht") were also issued, in 1922, in denominations of 10 and 25 marks.

See also

References

Currencies of Estonia
Economic history of Estonia
Modern obsolete currencies
1918 establishments in Estonia
1928 disestablishments